Derikha (also Romanized as Derīkhā; also known as Derīkhvāh) is a village in Kohurestan Rural District, in the Central District of Khamir County, Hormozgan Province, Iran. At the 2006 census, its population was 108, in 30 families.

References 

Populated places in Khamir County